Gazmend Oketa (born 14 December 1968 in Durrës District, Albania) is an Albanian politician. He served as Deputy Prime Minister of Albania, as well as Minister of Defence.

Political career
On 12 March 2007, Oketa was named Deputy Prime Minister, replacing Ilir Rusmajli. On 22 March 2008, Oketa succeeded Fatmir Mediu as Minister Of Defence following Medihu's resignation. He was replaced on 17 September 2009 by Arben Imami.

On 30 May 2012, Oketa formed a new political party in Albania, New Democratic Spirit, alongside other Democratic Party politicians.  Albanian media called it "The Party of President" referring to Bamir Topi.

References

External links
 Biography at the Albanian Ministry of Defence 

1968 births
Living people
People from Durrës
New Democratic Spirit politicians
Government ministers of Albania
Defence ministers of Albania
21st-century Albanian politicians